Allen Warren (2 May 1931 – 6 September 1974) was an Australian rules footballer who played for the Footscray Football Club in the Victorian Football League (VFL).

Notes

External links 
		

1931 births
1974 deaths
Australian rules footballers from Victoria (Australia)
Western Bulldogs players
East Geelong Football Club players